Stina Cronholm (later Onsö; born 18 April 1936) is a retired Swedish athlete who won national titles in the 80 m hurdles (1953–57) and pentathlon (1953–58). She competed in these event at the 1954 and 1958 European Athletics Championships and placed 16th–18th.

References

Swedish female hurdlers
Swedish heptathletes
1936 births
Living people
Sportspeople from Malmö
20th-century Swedish women